The 2019–20 Wofford Terriers men's basketball team represented Wofford College in the 2019–20 NCAA Division I men's basketball season. The Terriers, led by first-year head coach Jay McAuley, played their home games at Jerry Richardson Indoor Stadium in Spartanburg, South Carolina as members of the Southern Conference. They finished the season 19–16, 8–10 i SoCon play to finish in seventh place. They defeated The Citadel, Furman, and Chattanooga to advance to the championship game of the SoCon tournament where they lost to East Tennessee State.

Previous season
The Terriers finished the 2018–19 season 30–5 overall, 18–0 in SoCon play to finish as SoCon regular season champions. On February 25, the Terriers entered the AP Poll at No. 24, earning their first AP Poll appearance in program history. In the SoCon tournament, they defeated VMI in the quarterfinals, East Tennessee State in the semifinals, advancing to the championship, where they defeated UNC Greensboro, finishing with a perfect conference record, and earning the SoCon's automatic bid into the NCAA tournament. In the NCAA Tournament, they received the No. 7 seed in the Midwest Region, where they were matched up against No. 10 seeded Seton Hall in the first round, winning the game by a final score of, 84–68, earning their first NCAA Tournament win in program history. They faced No. 2 seeded Kentucky in the second round, losing 56–62, ending their most successful season in program history.

On April 7, 2019, it was announced that head coach Mike Young was named the new head coach at Virginia Tech. A week later, on April 14, assistant coach Jay McAuley was promoted to head coach.

Roster

Schedule and results

|-
!colspan=12 style=| Non-conference regular season

|-
!colspan=9 style=| SoCon regular season

|-
!colspan=12 style=| SoCon tournament
|-

|-

Source

References

Wofford Terriers men's basketball seasons
Wofford Terriers
Wofford Terriers men's basketball
Wofford Terriers men's basketball